KYFA-FM is a radio station broadcasting on 91.5 FM, licensed to Ginger, Texas, United States. The station feeds a dependent translator, K240DS 95.9 FM licensed to Garland, with partial coverage of the eastern portion of the Dallas–Fort Worth Metroplex. KYFA and K240DS air Spanish-language Christian programming and are known as La Estación para la Familia (The Station for the Family).

History

On May 28, 2008, the Federal Communications Commission granted a construction permit to the Iglesia Cristiana Ebenezer to build a new radio station in Ginger. The permit was transferred twice, to Hispanic Family Christian Network and then to the Central Park Church of God, before KYFA-FM began operations in December 2010.

External links
Official website

YFA-FM
YFA-FM
Radio stations established in 2010
2010 establishments in Texas